The İzmir mayoral elections of 2014 were held on 30 March 2014 as part of the nationwide local elections held on the same day. Mayors for the metropolitan municipality of İzmir and 30 other district municipalities throughout the İzmir Province were elected during the election, as well as municipal councillors for each district. The incumbent Aziz Kocaoğlu from the Republican People's Party (CHP) was re-elected as the metropolitan mayor of İzmir with 49.6% of the vote.

The governing Justice and Development Party (AKP) embarked on a particularly strong campaign, since İzmir was widely seen as the most significant stronghold of the opposition throughout the country. An AKP gain in İzmir would thus be significant due to the impact it would have on the opposition. Although the AKP was unable to win the metropolitan municipality, they won numerous other municipalities mostly in the south of the province, capitalising on their policy of extending the İZBAN commuter rail service to them. The Nationalist Movement Party also took two municipalities despite controlling none previously. Overall, the CHP won 23 of the 31 mayoral positions up for election, the AKP won 6 and the MHP won 2.

Large-scale electoral fraud was reported during the counting process in İzmir, with the province being one of several provinces suffering from controversial electricity cuts on the eve of polling day.

İzmir Metropolitan Municipality

Districts

Aliağa

Balçova

Bayındır

Bayraklı

Bergama

Beydağ

Bornova

Buca

Çeşme

Çiğli

Dikili

Foça

Gaziemir

Güzelbahçe

Karabağlar

Karaburun

Karşıyaka

Kemalpaşa

Kınık

Kiraz

Konak

Menderes

Menemen

Narlıdere

Ödemiş

Seferihisar

Selçuk

Tire

Torbalı

Urla

References

2014 elections in Turkey
2014 Turkish local elections
2010s in İzmir